The 2014–15 Momentum One Day Cup was a domestic one-day cricket championship in South Africa. It was the 34th time the championship was contested. The competition started on 10 October 2014 and the final took place on 13 February 2015. The Titans defeated the Cape Cobras in the final, which was played at Newlands Cricket Ground in Cape Town.

Group stage

Points table

Knockout stage
Of the 6 participants, the following 3 teams qualified for the knockout stage:

Semi-final

Final

Statistics

Most Runs

Source: Cricinfo

Most Wickets

Source: Cricinfo

External links
 Series home at ESPN Cricinfo

References 

South African domestic cricket competitions
Momentum One Day Cup